The Yangon University of Education (formerly the Yangon Institute of Education;  ; abbreviated YUOE), located in Kamayut, Yangon, is the premier university of education in Myanmar. Primarily a teacher training college, the institute offers bachelor's, master's and doctoral degree programs in education to the country's prospective primary, secondary and tertiary school teachers. Its training high school known as TTC is considered one of the best high schools in the country.

History
The institute began as the Department of Education under Rangoon University (Yangon University) in 1924, and in 1931 became a separate college, still under Rangoon University as the Teacher's Training College (TTC). It became an independent institute in 1964. Until very recently, all educational colleges throughout the country were under the Yangon University of Education.

Affiliated universities and colleges
Along with the Sagaing Institute of Education, the Yangon University of Education is affiliated with 22 educational colleges located throughout the country.

 Bogalay Education College
 Dawei Education College
 Hlegu Education College
 Hpa-An Education College
 Kyaukphyu Education College
 Lashio Education College
 Loikaw Education College
 Magway Education College
 Mandalay Education College
 Mawlamyaing Education College
 Monywa Education College
 Meiktila Education College
 Myaungmya Education College
 Myitkyina Education College
 Pakokku Education College
 Pathein Education College
 Pyay Education College
 Sagaing Education College
 Taungoo Education College
 Taunggyi Education College
 Thingangyun Education College
 Yankin Education College

Departments
The departments can be grouped into three categories: Education departments, Academic Departments, and Administration departments.

Education departments include:
Department of Educational Theory and Management 
Department of Educational Psychology
Curriculum and Methodology Department 
Department of Physical Education and School Health
Academic Departments include:
Myanmar Department
English Department
Mathematics Department
Chemistry Department
Physics Department
Biology Department
Geography Department
History Department
Economics Department

References

External links
Official website

Universities and colleges in Yangon
Universities and colleges in Myanmar
Education schools in Myanmar